Ava Seumanufagai (born 3 June 1991) is a New Zealand professional rugby league footballer who currently plays for Leigh Leopards in the Betfred Super League.
He previously played for the Wests Tigers, Cronulla-Sutherland Sharks and the Canterbury Bulldogs in the NRL and the Leeds Rhinos in the European Super League.

Background
Seumanufagai was born in Wellington, New Zealand and is of Tokelau and Samoan descent. 

He played his junior football for the Wainuiomata Lions and the Hills District Bulls before being signed by the Parramatta Eels.

Playing career

Early career
Seumanufagai played for the Parramatta Eels NYC team in 2010 and 2011, scoring 2 tries in 43 games. In 2012, Seumanufagai joined the Wests Tigers. Seumanufagai spent his first season playing NSW Cup, and was a member of the Balmain Ryde Eastwood Tigers side that lost the NSW Cup grand final to the Newtown Jets.

2013
In Round 3, Seumanufagai made his NRL debut for the Wests Tigers against his former club, the Parramatta Eels in the Tigers 31–18 win at Leichhardt Oval. In Round 13 against the Penrith Panthers, Seumanufagai scored his first NRL try in the Tigers 20-18 win at Penrith Stadium. It was his sole try from 17 matches for the season.

2014
On 30 July, Seumanufagai re-signed with the Tigers on a one-year contract. Coach Mick Potter said, "Ava has steadily improved as the year has gone on. The players love it when Ava comes on the field, he gives us that lift and really deserves what he is getting." He finished the year having played in 23 matches. He was also named in the Samoa train-on squad for the Four Nations, but didn’t make the final 24 man squad.

2015
On 31 January and 1 February, Seumanufagai played for the Tigers in the 2015 NRL Auckland Nines. He made 23 appearances in the 2015 NRL season, all from the interchange bench as well as scoring 1 try for the Tigers. He was named as a reserve in Zero Tackle's Team of the Year. On 30 September, he re-signed with the Tigers for a further two seasons. Coach Jason Taylor said, "Ava is a tireless worker and a real asset to have on our playing roster. He's only 24 years old, so I'm confident that his best football is still ahead of him and that's really exciting for the club."

2016
In the pre-season, Seumanufagai again played in the Auckland Nines. He was one of just two Wests Tigers player to appear in every game of the season. Seumanufagai said that he felt his personal game had improved for the season, and was a step in the right direction.

2017
Seumanufagai again played in the Auckland Nines. On 2 May, he signed a two-year contract with the Cronulla-Sutherland Sharks, starting in 2018. In Round 10 against the South Sydney Rabbitohs, Seumanufagai was sinbinned for punching former Tigers team mate Robbie Farah in the head. In Round 15 against his future club Cronulla, Seumanufagai played his 100th NRL match in the Tigers 24–22 loss at Shark Park. Seumanufagai finished his last season with the Tigers with 2 tries from 18 matches.

2018
In Round 1 of the 2018 NRL season, Seumanufagai made his club debut for the Cronulla-Sutherland Sharks against the North Queensland Cowboys, playing off the interchange bench in the 20–14 loss at 1300SMILES Stadium.

Seumanufagai played for Cronulla's feeder club side Newtown in the 2018 Intrust Super Premiership NSW grand final against Canterbury-Bankstown at Leichhardt Oval which Newtown lost 18–12.

2019
Seumanufagai joined Leeds Rhinos on a two-year deal in May 2019.  In his first season he made 13 appearances for the Rhinos scoring one try after making his debut in David Furner's last match in charge - a defeat to Salford on 3 May.

2020
During the disrupted 2020 season Seumanufagai made a further 17 appearances scoring three tries. He played in the Challenge Cup Final where Leeds triumphed 17–16 over Salford.  On 27 December 2020 the club announced that they were releasing Seumanufagai from the final year of his contract due to "family reasons" as the travel restrictions in place were preventing him from seeing his young daughter.

2021
He made a total of 16 appearances for Canterbury in the 2021 NRL season as the club finished last and claimed the Wooden Spoon.

2022
Seumanufagai played a total of seven matches for Canterbury in the 2022 NRL season as the club finished 12th on the table.

References

External links

Leeds Rhinos profile
Cronulla Sharks profile
Wests Tigers profile
SL profile

1991 births
Living people
Balmain Ryde-Eastwood Tigers players
Canterbury-Bankstown Bulldogs players
Cronulla-Sutherland Sharks players
Leeds Rhinos players
Leigh Leopards players
New Zealand rugby league players
Expatriate sportspeople in England
Expatriate sportspeople in Australia
New Zealand sportspeople of Samoan descent
New Zealand people of Tokelauan descent
Newtown Jets NSW Cup players
Rugby league players from Wellington City
Rugby league props
Wainuiomata Lions players
Wests Tigers players
Wests Tigers NSW Cup players